Enteractinococcus fodinae is a bacterium from the genus of Enteractinococcus.

References

Bacteria described in 2011
Micrococcaceae